The Billboard Hot 100 is a chart that ranks the best-performing singles of the United States. Published by Billboard magazine, the data is compiled by Nielsen SoundScan based collectively on each single's weekly physical and digital sales, and airplay. In 2008, there were 14 singles that topped the chart in 52 issues of the magazine.

Rapper Flo Rida's "Low" was the first number one of the year, and the longest-running single in 2008, staying at number one for 10 consecutive weeks. It is the longest stay at the top for a single since R&B singer Beyoncé's "Irreplaceable" reigned for 10 straight weeks starting in late 2006. "Low" is the best-performing single of 2008 in the United States, ranking number one on Billboards year end chart of the Top Hot 100 Hits of 2008. Other singles with extended runs at number one include Katy Perry's "I Kissed a Girl", which stayed at the top spot for seven straight weeks, and T.I.'s "Whatever You Like", which topped the chart for seven non-consecutive weeks.

In 2008, seven acts gained their first U.S. number-one single: Flo Rida, Leona Lewis, Lil Wayne, Coldplay, and Perry, all of whom were lead artists, and Young Jeezy and Static Major as featured guests. Static Major was the seventh artist to hit number one posthumously, after his death in February 2008. T.I. earned his first number-one single as lead artist with "Whatever You Like". He also had the most weeks on top with 13, combining his two singles "Whatever You Like" and "Live Your Life", the latter of which charted at number one for six non-consecutive weeks. Artists to have multiple number one hits during the year were Rihanna with three, (one of those as a featured artist credit in "Live Your Life"), and T.I. with two. Rihanna spent the most time of any female at the top, spending nine non-consecutive weeks at number one on three different songs.

Highlights of the 2008 Billboard Hot 100 issues included pop singer Britney Spears' "Womanizer", which was noted for its record-breaking leap to number-one, from number 96. This is Spears' second number-one single, and her first number-one single in nine years. Pop singer Mariah Carey earned her 18th U.S. number-one single with "Touch My Body", which broke her tie with Elvis Presley, putting her in second position for artists with the most number ones in the rock era, which began in 1955. Leaving Carey two behind The Beatles with twenty number one singles. Singer Leona Lewis' "Bleeding Love" earned her the recognition of being the third female British act to have topped the Billboard Hot 100 with a debut single in the entire rock era. Perry's "I Kissed a Girl" became the 1,000th number-one song of the rock era. Although it occupied seven of summer's thirteen weeks, critics remained divided over which is 2008's Song of the Summer.

Chart history

Number-one artists

See also
2008 in music
List of Billboard number-one singles
Top Hot 100 Hits of 2008

References

Additional sources
Fred Bronson's Billboard Book of Number 1 Hits, 5th Edition
Joel Whitburn's Top Pop Singles 1955-2008, 12 Edition
Joel Whitburn Presents the Billboard Hot 100 Charts: The 2000s
Additional information obtained can be verified within Billboard's online archive services and print editions of the magazine.

United States Hot 100
2008
2008 in American music